A list of horror films released in 1989.

References

Sources

 

 

 

Lists of horror films by year
Hor